Inspector Rudra is a 1990 Indian Telugu-language action film written, directed and produced by K. S. R. Das for K. S. R. Das Productions. The film features Krishna Ghattamaneni, Yamuna, Gummadi, Kaikala Satyanarayana and Kota Srinivasa Rao. The film has musical score by Gangai Amaran. The film was a remake of Das's own Kannada film Rudra.

The film was released on 12 January 1990 as the first film release for actor Krishna but failed to do well at the box office.

Cast 
 Krishna Ghattamaneni
 Yamuna
 Satyanarayana Kaikala
 Gummadi
 Ranganath
 Kota Srinivasa Rao
 Charuhasan
 Hari Prasad
 Prasad Babu
 Jeeva
 Ravi Kondala Rao
 Bhimeswara Rao
 Telephone Satyanarayana

Songs 
Gangai Amaran scored and composed the film's soundtrack album. Veturi Sundararama Murthy penned the lyrics.
 "Chelli Nuvve Maa Inti" -
 "Chikchaang Chinnavaada" -
 "Kavvinche Kartheekam" -
 "Naa Age" -
 "Naatu Kotti Vachaka" -
 "Thega Preminchaku" -

References

External links 

1990 films
Indian action films
1990s masala films
Films scored by Gangai Amaran
1990s Telugu-language films
Telugu remakes of Kannada films
1990 action films